Bombus kirbiellus is a hymenopterous insect in the bee family. The scientific name of the species was first validly published in 1835 by Curtis. The species is found in Canada and the United States, and is on the IUCN Red List as having insufficient data to make an assessment.

References 

Bumblebees
Insects described in 1835